Murder at 45 RPM is a 1960 French psychological thriller film directed by Étienne Périer. It is based on a novel by Boileau-Narcejac.

Reception
According to MGM records the film made a profit of $9,000.

References

External links

Murder at 45 RPM at TCMDB

French psychological thriller films
1960 films
Metro-Goldwyn-Mayer films
Films based on French novels
Films based on works by Boileau-Narcejac
Films directed by Étienne Périer
1960s French-language films
1960s mystery films
1960s French films